The list of shipwrecks in April 1942 includes all ships sunk, foundered, grounded, or otherwise lost during April 1942.

1 April

2 April

3 April

4 April

5 April

6 April

7 April

8 April

9 April

10 April
For the scuttling of the former Finnish cargo ship Caroline Thordén on this date, see the entry for 26 March 1941.

11 April

12 April

13 April

14 April

15 April
For the scuttling of the Dutch tanker Ocana on this day, see the entry for 25 March 1942

16 April

17 April

18 April

19 April

20 April

21 April

22 April

23 April

24 April

25 April

26 April

27 April

28 April

29 April

30 April

Unknown date

References

1942-04